Susan Jane Belbin (born 20 October 1948) is a retired Scottish television director and producer whose work includes Bread, Are You Being Served?, Hi-de-Hi, One Foot in the Grave, 'Allo 'Allo, It Ain't Half Hot Mum, Only Fools and Horses and Jonathan Creek.

Personal life
Belbin was born in Inverness, Scotland in 1948. She later moved to London.

Career
She worked with Morcambe and Wise for three years and with David Croft for seven years. Later she often worked with David Renwick and produced and directed nearly all of Renwick's first five series of One Foot in the Grave. In 1997, she retired due to ill health and left the BBC. Renwick persuaded her to return to work on the final series to provide a certain amount of continuity. However, her ill health quickly forced her to resign from the show for a second time.

References

Footnotes

Bibliography

External links

1948 births
Living people
BBC television producers
British women television directors
British women television producers
Scottish television directors
Scottish television producers